Venezuela has an embassy in Montevideo. Uruguay has an embassy in Caracas and a consulate in Maracaibo.

History 
Historically, both countries were part of the Spanish Empire until the early 19th century. Nowadays, both countries are full members of the Rio Group, of the Latin Union, of ALADI, of the Association of Spanish Language Academies, of the Organization of American States, of the Organization of Ibero-American States, of the Community of Latin American and Caribbean States, of the Union of South American Nations and of the Group of 77.

Relations between both countries are not easy. The ruling Broad Front had an official position of support for the regime of Nicolás Maduro, while opposition politicians flatly denounced its human rights violations. Lately, the Uruguayan diplomat Luis Almagro, who in his role as Secretary General of OAS denounced the Venezuelan situation, was facing harsh questioning inside his party. 

In September 2020, the Foreign Minister of the Uruguayan new center-right government of President Luis Lacalle Pou said that the Venezuelan Nicolás Maduro regime is a dictatorship and that Uruguay would no longer encourage dialogue with the Maduro regime.

See also 
 Foreign relations of Uruguay
 Foreign relations of Venezuela
 Uruguayans in Venezuela
 Venezuelans in Uruguay

References

External links

 
Venezuela
Bilateral relations of Venezuela